The United States Football League Most Valuable Player Award (MVP) is an annual United States Football League (USFL) award given since the 2022 season to the best performing player of the regular season. The inaugural recipient of the award was KaVontae Turpin of the New Jersey Generals.

Winners

Teams

References 

United States Football League (2022)